Kidney disease, or renal disease, technically referred to as nephropathy, is damage to or disease of a kidney. Nephritis is an inflammatory kidney disease and has several types according to the location of the inflammation. Inflammation can be diagnosed by blood tests. Nephrosis is non-inflammatory kidney disease. Nephritis and nephrosis can give rise to nephritic syndrome and nephrotic syndrome respectively. Kidney disease usually causes a loss of kidney function to some degree and can result in kidney failure, the complete loss of kidney function. Kidney failure is known as the end-stage of kidney disease, where dialysis or a kidney transplant is the only treatment option.

Chronic kidney disease is defined as prolonged kidney abnormalities (functional and/or structural in nature) that last for more than three months. Acute kidney disease is now termed acute kidney injury and is marked by the sudden reduction in kidney function over seven days. In 2007, about one in eight Americans had chronic kidney disease. This rate is increasing over time to where about 1 in 7 Americans are estimated to have CKD as of 2021.

With the increasing prevalence of chronic kidney disease, there are many treatment plans available. Individuals can get blood or urine tests to access the health and function of the kidneys. For severe kidney disease, dialysis and kidney transplants are the most popular options. Dialysis is a treatment where it acts as an artificial kidney and removes waste products and fluid from an individual's blood. This is accomplished via a machine. Kidney transplants are the surgical procedure of transporting a healthy kidney from a donor into an individual with kidney disease. Both of these options have their pros and con, the success varies by individual.

Causes

Causes of kidney disease include deposition of the Immunoglobulin A antibodies in the glomerulus, administration of analgesics, xanthine oxidase deficiency, toxicity of chemotherapy agents, and long-term exposure to lead or its salts. Chronic conditions that can produce nephropathy include systemic lupus erythematosus, diabetes mellitus and high blood pressure (hypertension), which lead to diabetic nephropathy and hypertensive nephropathy, respectively.

Analgesics

One cause of nephropathy is the long term usage of pain medications known as analgesics. The pain medicines which can cause kidney problems include aspirin, acetaminophen, and nonsteroidal anti-inflammatory drugs (NSAIDs).  This form of nephropathy is "chronic analgesic nephritis," a chronic inflammatory change characterized by loss and atrophy of tubules and interstitial fibrosis and inflammation (BRS Pathology, 2nd edition).
The tissues, blood vessels, and overall structure of the kidneys are harmed in the condition known as kidney disease. The functions of the kidneys are impacted by this injury, which ultimately has an impact on a person's general health. A person's two kidneys function to eliminate waste and toxins from their body. When kidney function is disrupted, waste begins to mix back into the circulation, damaging additional internal organs.

Specifically, long-term use of the analgesic phenacetin has been linked to renal papillary necrosis (necrotizing papillitis).

Diabetes

Diabetic nephropathy is a progressive kidney disease caused by angiopathy of the capillaries in the glomeruli. It is characterized by nephrotic syndrome and diffuse scarring of the glomeruli. It is particularly associated with poorly managed diabetes mellitus and is a primary reason for dialysis in many developed countries. It is classified as a small blood vessel complication of diabetes.

Autosomal dominant polycystic kidney disease 
Gabow 1990 talks about Autosomal Dominant Polycystic Kidney disease and how this disease is genetic. They go on to say "Autosomal dominant polycystic kidney disease (ADPKD) is the most common genetic disease, affecting a half million Americans. The clinical phenotype can result from at least two different gene defects. One gene that can cause ADPKD has been located on the short arm of chromosome 16." The same article also goes on to say that millions of Americans are effected by this disease and is very common.

Long COVID and Kidney Disease 
Yende & Parikh 2021 talk about the effects that COVID can have on a person that has a pre-existing health issue regarding kidney diseases. "frailty, chronic diseases, disability and immunodeficiency are at increased risk of kidney disease and progression to kidney failure, and infection with SARS-CoV-2 can further increase this risk” (Long COVID and Kidney Disease, 2021).

Diet
Higher dietary intake of animal protein, animal fat, and cholesterol may increase risk for microalbuminuria, a sign of kidney function decline, and generally, diets higher in fruits, vegetables, and whole grains but lower in meat and sweets may be protective against kidney function decline. This may be because sources of animal protein, animal fat, and cholesterol, and sweets are more acid-producing, while fruits, vegetables, legumes, and whole grains are more base-producing.

IgA nephropathy

IgA nephropathy is the most common glomerulonephritis throughout the world  Primary IgA nephropathy is characterized by deposition of the IgA antibody in the glomerulus. The classic presentation (in 40-50% of the cases) is episodic frank hematuria which usually starts within a day or two of a non-specific upper respiratory tract infection (hence synpharyngitic) as opposed to post-streptococcal glomerulonephritis which occurs some time (weeks) after initial infection. Less commonly gastrointestinal or urinary infection can be the inciting agent. All of these infections have in common the activation of mucosal defenses and hence IgA antibody production.

Iodinated contrast media

Kidney disease induced by iodinated contrast media (ICM) is called CIN (= contrast induced nephropathy) or contrast-induced AKI (= acute kidney injury). Currently, the underlying mechanisms are unclear. But there is a body of evidence that several factors including apoptosis-induction seem to play a role.

Lithium
Lithium, a medication commonly used to treat bipolar disorder and schizoaffective disorders, can cause nephrogenic diabetes insipidus; its long-term use can lead to nephropathy.

Lupus
Despite expensive treatments, lupus nephritis remains a major cause of morbidity and mortality in people with relapsing or refractory lupus nephritis.

Xanthine oxidase deficiency

Another possible cause of Kidney disease is due to decreased function of xanthine oxidase in the purine degradation pathway. Xanthine oxidase will degrade hypoxanthine to xanthine and then to uric acid. Xanthine is not very soluble in water; therefore, an increase in xanthine forms crystals (which can lead to kidney stones) and result in damage to the kidney. Xanthine oxidase inhibitors, like allopurinol, can cause nephropathy.

Polycystic disease of the kidneys

Additional possible cause of nephropathy is due to the formation of cysts or pockets containing fluid within the kidneys. These cysts become enlarged with the progression of aging causing renal failure. Cysts may also form in other organs including the liver, brain, and ovaries. Polycystic Kidney Disease is a genetic disease caused by mutations in the PKD1, PKD2, and PKHD1 genes. This disease affects about half a million people in the US. Polycystic kidneys are susceptible to infections and cancer.

Toxicity of chemotherapy agents

Nephropathy can be associated with some therapies used to treat cancer.  The most common form of kidney disease in cancer patients is Acute Kidney Injury (AKI) which can usually be due to volume depletion from vomiting and diarrhea that occur following chemotherapy or occasionally due to kidney toxicities of chemotherapeutic agents.  Kidney failure from break down of cancer cells, usually after chemotherapy, is unique to onconephrology. Several chemotherapeutic agents, for example Cisplatin, are associated with acute and chronic kidney injuries. Newer agents such as anti Vascular Endothelial Growth Factor (anti VEGF) are also associated with similar injuries, as well as proteinuria, hypertension and thrombotic microangiopathy.

Diagnosis
The standard diagnostic workup of suspected kidney disease includes a medical history, physical examination, a urine test, and an ultrasound of the kidneys (renal ultrasonography). An ultrasound is essential in the diagnosis and management of kidney disease.

Treatment 
Treatment approaches for kidney disease focus on managing the symptoms, controlling the progression, and also treating co-morbidities that a person may have.

Dialysis

Transplantation 

Millions of people across the world have kidney disease. Of those millions, several thousand will need dialysis or a kidney transplant at its end-stage. In the United States, as of 2008, 16,500 people needed a kidney transplant. Of those, 5,000 died while waiting for a transplant. Currently, there is a shortage of donors, and in 2007 there were only 64,606 kidney transplants in the world. This shortage of donors is causing countries to place monetary value on kidneys.  Countries such as Iran and Singapore are eliminating their lists by paying their citizens to donate.  Also, the black market accounts for 5-10 percent of transplants that occur worldwide.  The act of buying an organ through the black market is illegal in the United States. To be put on the waiting list for a kidney transplant, patients must first be referred by a physician, then they must choose and contact a donor hospital.  Once they choose a donor hospital, patients must then receive an evaluation to make sure they are sustainable to receive a transplant. In order to be a match for a kidney transplant, patients must match blood type and human leukocyte antigen factors with their donors. They must also have no reactions to the antibodies from the donor's kidneys.

Prognosis
Kidney disease can have serious consequences if it cannot be controlled effectively. Generally, the progression of kidney disease is from mild to serious. Some kidney diseases can cause kidney failure.

See also
 Hematologic Diseases Information Service
 Mesoamerican nephropathy, an enigmatic chronic kidney disease of Central America
 Protein toxicity

References

https://www.mayoclinic.org/diseases-conditions/chronic-kidney-disease/diagnosis-treatment/drc-20354527

External links 

Kidney diseases